Paula Ben-Gurion (née Munweis) (April 1892 – 29 January 1968) was the wife of David Ben-Gurion, the first Prime Minister of the State of Israel.

Biography
Paula Munweis was born in Minsk, then part of the Russian Empire, the daughter of Samuel Munweis and Bertha Bloch. She immigrated to New York as a teenager where the 1910 United States census gave her date of birth as 1890. She was trained as a nurse at Beth Israel Hospital in Newark, New Jersey and worked in a New York gynaecological clinic. 
David Ben-Gurion met her at the home of her employer and Poale Zion supporter Dr Samuel Ellsberg in summer of 1915. They spoke Yiddish together because Ben-Gurion's English was poor and Paula couldn't speak Hebrew. They married in 1917 at New York City's town hall. The following year Ben-Gurion enlisted as a soldier in the new British-raised Jewish Legion. He left Paula 3 months pregnant. They did not meet again until she arrived, with their one year old daughter Geula, in Jaffa 18 months later. Paula was originally against the idea of going to Israel, as her anarchist politics pitted her against both Zionism and state building. Recalling this period Ben-Gurion said that she was not a Zionist, she had very little Jewish feeling, she was an American, she was an anarchist. She had no interest in Israel. "America is better, why do we need the land of Israel?" 
They had three children,  Geula, Amos and Renana. Throughout their marriage she had to endure Ben-Gurion's long absences abroad and recurring suspicions, sometimes justified, about his relationships with other women.

She was known for her acerbic tongue. She was fluent in Yiddish, English, and Hebrew. A feisty woman, she had no qualms about asking her husband to wash the dishes.  She was bemused by her husband's interest in yoga and when his tutor, the famous Moshé Feldenkrais would show up she would say: "Here comes Mr. Hocus Pocus."

Paula is buried with her husband in Midreshet Ben-Gurion in Israel's Negev desert.

In 1958, David Ben-Gurion published his letters to her: Letters to Paula and the Children.

Legacy and commemoration
A number of schools and institutions in Israel are named for her.  Leslie Moonves, former president and CEO of CBS Television, is her grand-nephew.

See also
Women of Israel

References

External links

Further reading
Helmreich, William B. (1998). The Enduring Community: The Jews of Newark and Metrowest. Transaction Publishers. 

1892 births
1968 deaths
American emigrants to Israel
American people of Russian-Jewish descent
Emigrants from the Russian Empire to the United States
Jews from the Russian Empire
Ashkenazi Jews in Mandatory Palestine
Israeli Ashkenazi Jews
Israeli nurses
Spouses of prime ministers of Israel
David Ben-Gurion